The 2016 Categoría Primera B season (officially known as the 2016 Torneo Águila season for sponsorship reasons) was the 27th season since its founding.

Format
The league retained the format used in the most recent season. The tournament was played in a year-round competition with the 16 teams playing the other teams twice on a home-and-away basis and playing a regional rival twice more for a total of 32 matches. The top eight teams after the thirty-two rounds advanced to the Semifinal round where the eight teams were sorted into two groups of four and played a double Round-robin tournament group stage. Both group winners earn promotion to the Categoría Primera A and also advanced to the Final round, which consisted of two legs to decide the winner.

Teams

a: Formerly known as Dépor.
b: Played at Polideportivo Sur in Envigado for most of the second half of the season.
c: Formerly known as Expreso Rojo.

First stage

Standings

Results

Regular matches

Regional derbies (Rounds 8 & 24)

Semifinals
The Semifinal stage began on October 22 and ended on November 28. The eight teams that advanced were sorted into two groups of four teams. Tigres and América de Cali topped their respective groups and as a result both advanced to the finals and were also promoted to the Categoría Primera A for the 2017 season.

Group A

Group B

Finals

Top goalscorers

Source: DIMAYOR

Aggregate table

References

External links 
  

Categoría Primera B seasons
1
Colombia